Saeid Agin Sagna is a retired Nigerian footballer who appeared in Iranian League between 1991 and 1993. He was son of a Nigerian embassy employee in Tehran. He is the first foreign footballer who played for Bank Tejarat and Poora, and Sanati Kaveh.

References

 Saeid Agin Sagna Can leave Iran!
 Saeid Agin Sagna at Navad
 Saeid Agin Sagna at Navad

1975 births
Living people
Nigerian footballers
Expatriate footballers in Iran

Association footballers not categorized by position
Sanati Kaveh players